This is the discography of British rock band the Move.

Albums

Studio albums

Live albums

Compilation albums

EPs

Singles

Notes

References

External links

Discographies of British artists
Rock music group discographies